Gilberto Owen Estrada (May 13, 1904 – March 9, 1952) was a Mexican poet and diplomat.

Biography 
Officially registered as Gilberto Estrada, son of Margarita Estrada from Michoacán, Gilberto Owen was born in Rosario, Sinaloa (May 13, 1904). He spent some of his early years (1919–1923) in Toluca, where he studied at the Instituto Científico y Literario. In 1923, he left Toluca and went to Mexico City, after he got contact to General Álvaro Obregón, who engaged him in the Secretaría de la Presidencia, where he served from August 1923 to June 1928. He matriculated in the Escuela Nacional Preparatoria. At this time he met the actress Clementina Otero, and people like Bernardo Ortiz de Montellano, Salvador Novo, Xavier Villaurrutia, Jorge Cuesta, Carlos Pellicer, Jaime Torres Bodet, José Gorostiza, Enrique González Rojo and others, when he joined the group Los Contemporáneos, where he also wrote for the magazine "Ulises" in 1926. He is presumed to be the romantic one and the least civilized of the group.

He spent some years in Bogota where he worked as a journalist and newspaper translator. It has been published recently a compilation of his work in 
Bogota, Colombia. Editors Celene García Ávila and Antonio Cajero rescued from El Tiempo (1933–1935) articles and chronicles which display a variety of styles and deal with topics such as politics, extraordinary facts and lifestyle in Latin America. This book was published by Miguel Angel Porrua and Autonomous University of the State of Mexico (UAEM) in 2009.

In July 1928 he became diplomat of the Secretaría de Relaciones Exteriores, and so he lived and wrote the longest time of his life abroad, first in the United States, later in Peru, Ecuador, and at the end of 1932 in Colombia, where he married Cecilia Salazar Roldán on December 2, 1935, daughter of the Colombian General and governor of Panama Víctor Manuel Salazar. In Bogotá he published sporadically in the newspaper "El Tiempo". After his marriage failed, he returned to Mexico in 1942, where he wrote for the magazine "El hijo pródigo". In the end of the 1940s he had serious health problems, when he was transferred to the Consulate of Mexico in Philadelphia, where he finally served as vice-consul.

Owen died in Philadelphia of cirrhosis, and is buried in the Holy Cross Cemetery, Yeadon, Pennsylvania.

A literature prize is awarded in his name.

Works 

 La llama fría (short-novel), 1925
 Desvelo, 1925
 Novela como nube (prose), 1928
 Línea, 1930
 Libro de Ruth, 1944
 Perseo vencido, 1948
 Simbad el varado, 1948
 Poesía y prosa, 1953
 Primeros versos, 1957
 El infierno perdido, 1978
 Obras, 1979

Further reading 
 Tomás Segovia: Cuatro ensayos sobre Gilberto Owen (Spanish), 2001 
 Guillermo Sheridan: Tres ensayos sobre Gilberto Owen (Spanish), 2008 
 Francisco Javier Beltrán Cabrera, Cynthia Araceli Ramírez Peñaloza: Gilberto Owen Estrada: cien años de poesía (Spanish), 2005 
 Francisco Javier Beltrán Cabrera, Cynthia Araceli Ramírez Peñaloza: Lope de Vega, Góngora y Gilberto Owen (Spanish), 2006.
 Francisco Javier Beltrán Cabrera, Cynthia Araceli Ramírez Peñaloza: Notas para una nueva edición de la obra de Gilberto Owen (Spanish), 2006.
 Francisco Javier Beltrán Cabrera, Cynthia Araceli Ramírez Peñaloza: La revista Esfuerzo: inicios periodísticos de Gilberto Owen (Spanish), 2007.
 Francisco Javier Beltrán Cabrera, Cynthia Araceli Ramírez Peñaloza: La poesía pura y la vida (o el ejercicio oweniano de poesía pura) (Spanish), 2011.
 Cynthia Araceli Ramírez Peñaloza: Gilberto Owen, escritor y editor enfocado en las mujeres (Spanish), 2015.
 Celene García Ávila y Antonio Cajero Vázquez (2009), Gilberto Owen en El tiempo de Bogotá, prosas recuperadas (1933-1935)

References

External links 
 (Spanish), Miguel Ángel Porrúa /Universidad autónoma del Estado de México, México.    . Print.
 
 
 ,   http://www.redalyc.org/pdf/104/10414216.pdf

Mexican male writers
Mexican diplomats
Writers from Sinaloa
1904 births
1952 deaths
Mexican people of Irish descent
Mexican expatriates in Colombia
Mexican expatriates in Ecuador
Mexican expatriates in the United States